Life is a quality that distinguishes matter that has biological processes, such as signaling and self-sustaining processes, from matter that does not, and is defined by the capacity for growth, reaction to stimuli, metabolism, energy transformation, and reproduction. Various forms of life exist, such as plants, animals, fungi, protists, archaea, and bacteria. Biology is the science that studies life.

The gene is the unit of heredity, whereas the cell is the structural and functional unit of life. There are two kinds of cells, prokaryotic and eukaryotic, both of which consist of cytoplasm enclosed within a membrane and contain many biomolecules such as proteins and nucleic acids. Cells reproduce through a process of cell division, in which the parent cell divides into two or more daughter cells and passes its genes onto a new generation, sometimes producing genetic variation.

Organisms, or the individual entities of life, are generally thought to be open systems that maintain homeostasis, are composed of cells, have a life cycle, undergo metabolism, can grow, adapt to their environment, respond to stimuli, reproduce and evolve over multiple generations. Other definitions sometimes include non-cellular life forms such as viruses and viroids, but they are usually excluded because they do not function on their own; rather, they exploit the biological processes of hosts.

Abiogenesis, also known as the origin of life, is the natural process of life arising from non-living matter, such as simple organic compounds. Since its primordial beginnings, life on Earth has changed its environment on a geologic time scale, but it has also adapted to survive in most ecosystems and conditions. New lifeforms have evolved from common ancestors through hereditary variation and natural selection, and today, estimates of the number of distinct species range anywhere from 3 million to over 100 million.

Death is the permanent termination of all biological processes which sustain an organism, and as such, is the end of its life. Extinction is the term describing the dying-out of a group or taxon, usually a species. Once extinct, the extinct species or taxon cannot come back to life.  Fossils are the preserved remains or traces of organisms.

Definitions
The definition of life has long been a challenge for scientists and philosophers. This is partially because life is a process, not a substance. This is complicated by a lack of knowledge of the characteristics of living entities, if any, that may have developed outside of Earth. Philosophical definitions of life have also been put forward, with similar difficulties on how to distinguish living things from the non-living. Legal definitions of life have also been described and debated, though these generally focus on the decision to declare a human dead, and the legal ramifications of this decision. As many as 123 definitions of life have been compiled.

Biology

Since there is no consensus for a definition of life, most current definitions in biology are descriptive. Life is considered a characteristic of something that preserves, furthers or reinforces its existence in the given environment. This characteristic exhibits all or most of the following traits:
 Homeostasis: regulation of the internal environment to maintain a constant state; for example, sweating to reduce temperature
 Organisation: being structurally composed of one or more cells – the basic units of life
 Metabolism: transformation of energy by converting chemicals and energy into cellular components (anabolism) and decomposing organic matter (catabolism). Living things require energy to maintain internal organisation (homeostasis) and to produce the other phenomena associated with life.
 Growth: maintenance of a higher rate of anabolism than catabolism. A growing organism increases in size in all of its parts, rather than simply accumulating matter.
 Adaptation: the evolutionary process whereby an organism becomes better able to live in its habitat or habitats.
 Response to stimuli: a response can take many forms, from the contraction of a unicellular organism to external chemicals, to complex reactions involving all the senses of multicellular organisms. A response is often expressed by motion; for example, the leaves of a plant turning toward the sun (phototropism), and chemotaxis.
 Reproduction: the ability to produce new individual organisms, either asexually from a single parent organism or sexually from two parent organisms.

These complex processes, called physiological functions, have underlying physical and chemical bases, as well as signaling and control mechanisms that are essential to maintaining life.

Alternative definitions

From a physics perspective, living beings are thermodynamic systems with an organised molecular structure that can reproduce itself and evolve as survival dictates. Thermodynamically, life has been described as an open system which makes use of gradients in its surroundings to create imperfect copies of itself. Another way of putting this is to define life as "a self-sustained chemical system capable of undergoing Darwinian evolution", a definition adopted by a NASA committee attempting to define life for the purposes of exobiology, based on a suggestion by Carl Sagan. This definition, however, has been widely criticized because according to it, a single sexually reproducing individual is not alive as it is incapable of evolving on its own. The reason for this potential flaw is that "NASA's definition" refers to life as a phenomenon, not a living individual, which makes it incomplete. Alternative, definitions based on the notion of life as a phenomenon and a living individual have been proposed as continuum of a self-maintainable information, and a distinct element of this continuum, respectively. A major strength of this approach is that it defines life in terms of mathematics and physics, avoiding biological vocabulary, which inevitably leads to pleonasticity.

Others take a systemic viewpoint that does not necessarily depend on molecular chemistry. One systemic definition of life is that living things are self-organizing and autopoietic (self-producing). Variations of this definition include Stuart Kauffman's definition as an autonomous agent or a multi-agent system capable of reproducing itself or themselves, and of completing at least one thermodynamic work cycle. This definition is extended by the apparition of novel functions over time.

Viruses

Whether or not viruses should be considered as alive is controversial. They are most often considered as just gene coding replicators rather than forms of life. They have been described as "organisms at the edge of life" because they possess genes, evolve by natural selection, and replicate by making multiple copies of themselves through self-assembly. However, viruses do not metabolise and they require a host cell to make new products. Virus self-assembly within host cells has implications for the study of the origin of life, as it may support the hypothesis that life could have started as self-assembling organic molecules.

Biophysics

To reflect the minimum phenomena required, other biological definitions of life have been proposed, with many of these being based upon chemical systems. Biophysicists have commented that living things function on negative entropy. In other words, living processes can be viewed as a delay of the spontaneous diffusion or dispersion of the internal energy of biological molecules towards more potential microstates. In more detail, according to physicists such as John Bernal, Erwin Schrödinger, Eugene Wigner, and John Avery, life is a member of the class of phenomena that are open or continuous systems able to decrease their internal entropy at the expense of substances or free energy taken in from the environment and subsequently rejected in a degraded form. The emergence and increasing popularity of biomimetics or biomimicry (the design and production of materials, structures, and systems that are modelled on biological entities and processes) will likely redefine the boundary between natural and artificial life.

Living systems theories

Living systems are open self-organizing living things that interact with their environment. These systems are maintained by flows of information, energy, and matter.

Budisa, Kubyshkin and Schmidt defined cellular life as an organizational unit resting on four pillars/cornerstones: (i) energy, (ii) metabolism, (iii) information and (iv) form. This system is able to regulate and control metabolism and energy supply and contains at least one subsystem that functions as an information carrier (genetic information). Cells as self-sustaining units are parts of different populations that are involved in the unidirectional and irreversible open-ended process known as evolution.

Some scientists have proposed in the last few decades that a general living systems theory is required to explain the nature of life. Such a general theory would arise out of the ecological and biological sciences and attempt to map general principles for how all living systems work. Instead of examining phenomena by attempting to break things down into components, a general living systems theory explores phenomena in terms of dynamic patterns of the relationships of organisms with their environment.

Gaia hypothesis

The idea that Earth is alive is found in philosophy and religion, but the first scientific discussion of it was by the Scottish scientist James Hutton. In 1785, he stated that Earth was a superorganism and that its proper study should be physiology. Hutton is considered the father of geology, but his idea of a living Earth was forgotten in the intense reductionism of the 19th century. The Gaia hypothesis, proposed in the 1960s by scientist James Lovelock, suggests that life on Earth functions as a single organism that defines and maintains environmental conditions necessary for its survival. This hypothesis served as one of the foundations of the modern Earth system science.

Self-maintainable information
All living entities posess genetic information that maintains itself by processess called cis-actions. Cis-action is any action that has an impact on the initiator, and in chemical systems is known as the autocatalytic set. In living systems, all the cis-actions have generally a positive influence on the system as those with negative impact are eliminated by natural selection. Genetic information acts as an initiator, and it can maintain itself via a series of cis-actions like self-repair or self-production (the production of parts of the body to be distinguished from self-reproduction, which is a duplication of the entire entity). Various cis-actions give the entity additional traits to be considered alive. Self-maintainable information is a basic requirement - a level zero for gaining lifeness and it can be obtained by any cis-action like self-repair (like a gene coding a protein that fixes alteration to a nucleic acid caused by UV radiation). Subsequently, if the entity is able to perform error-prone self-reproduction it gains the trait of evolution and belongs to a continuum of self-maintainable information - it becomes part of the living world in meaning of phenomenon but not yet a living individual. For this upgrade, the entity has to process the trait of distinctness, understood as an ability to define itself as a separate entity with its own fate. There are two possible ways of reaching distinctness: 1) maintaining an open-system (a cell) or/and 2) maintaining a transmission process (for obligatory parasites). Fulfiling any of these cis-actions raises the entity to a level of living individual - a distinct element of the self-maintainable information's continuum. The final level regards the state of the entity as dead or alive and requires the trait of functionality.

This approach provides a lather-like hierarchy of entities depending on their ability to maintain themselves, their evolvability, and their distinctness. It also distinguishes between life as a phenomenon, a living individual, and an alive individual.

Nonfractionability
Robert Rosen devoted a large part of his career, from 1958 onwards, to developing a comprehensive theory of life as a self-organizing complex system, "closed to efficient causation". He defined a system component as "a unit of organization; a part with a function, i.e., a definite relation between part and whole." He identified the "nonfractionability of components in an organism" as the fundamental difference between living systems and "biological machines." He summarised his views in his book Life Itself. Similar ideas may be found in the book Living Systems by James Grier Miller.

Property of ecosystems
A systems view of life treats environmental fluxes and biological fluxes together as a "reciprocity of influence," and a reciprocal relation with environment is arguably as important for understanding life as it is for understanding ecosystems. As Harold J. Morowitz (1992) explains it, life is a property of an ecological system rather than a single organism or species. He argues that an ecosystemic definition of life is preferable to a strictly biochemical or physical one. Robert Ulanowicz (2009) highlights mutualism as the key to understand the systemic, order-generating behaviour of life and ecosystems.

Complex systems biology

Complex systems biology (CSB) is a field of science that studies the emergence of complexity in functional organisms from the viewpoint of dynamic systems theory. The latter is also often called systems biology and aims to understand the most fundamental aspects of life. A closely related approach to CSB and systems biology called relational biology is concerned mainly with understanding life processes in terms of the most important relations, and categories of such relations among the essential functional components of organisms; for multicellular organisms, this has been defined as "categorical biology", or a model representation of organisms as a category theory of biological relations, as well as an algebraic topology of the functional organisation of living organisms in terms of their dynamic, complex networks of metabolic, genetic, and epigenetic processes and signalling pathways. Alternative but closely related approaches focus on the interdependence of constraints, where constraints can be either molecular, such as enzymes, or macroscopic, such as the geometry of a bone or of the vascular system.

Darwinian dynamic

It has also been argued that the evolution of order in living systems and certain physical systems obeys a common fundamental principle termed the Darwinian dynamic. The Darwinian dynamic was formulated by first considering how macroscopic order is generated in a simple non-biological system far from thermodynamic equilibrium, and then extending consideration to short, replicating RNA molecules. The underlying order-generating process was concluded to be basically similar for both types of systems.

Operator theory

Another systemic definition called the operator theory proposes that life is a general term for the presence of the typical closures found in organisms; the typical closures are a membrane and an autocatalytic set in the cell and that an organism is any system with an organisation that complies with an operator type that is at least as complex as the cell. Life can also be modelled as a network of inferior negative feedbacks of regulatory mechanisms subordinated to a superior positive feedback formed by the potential of expansion and reproduction.

History of study

Materialism

Some of the earliest theories of life were materialist, holding that all that exists is matter, and that life is merely a complex form or arrangement of matter. Empedocles (430 BC) argued that everything in the universe is made up of a combination of four eternal "elements" or "roots of all": earth, water, air, and fire. All change is explained by the arrangement and rearrangement of these four elements. The various forms of life are caused by an appropriate mixture of elements.

Democritus (460 BC) thought that the essential characteristic of life is having a soul (psyche). Like other ancient writers, he was attempting to explain what makes something a living thing. His explanation was that fiery atoms make a soul in exactly the same way atoms and void account for any other thing. He elaborates on fire because of the apparent connection between life and heat, and because fire moves.

The mechanistic materialism that originated in ancient Greece was revived and revised by the French philosopher René Descartes (1596–1650), who held that animals and humans were assemblages of parts that together functioned as a machine. This idea was developed further by Julien Offray de La Mettrie (1709–1750) in his book L'Homme Machine.

In the 19th century the advances in cell theory in biological science encouraged this view. The evolutionary theory of Charles Darwin (1859) is a mechanistic explanation for the origin of species by means of natural selection.

At the beginning of the 20th century Stéphane Leduc (1853–1939) promoted the idea that biological processes could be understood in terms of physics and chemistry, and that their growth resembled that of inorganic crystals immersed in solutions of sodium silicate. His ideas, set out in his book La biologie synthétique was widely dismissed during his lifetime, but has incurred a resurgence of interest in the work of Russell, Barge and colleagues.

Hylomorphism

Hylomorphism is a theory first expressed by the Greek philosopher Aristotle (322 BC). The application of hylomorphism to biology was important to Aristotle, and biology is extensively covered in his extant writings. In this view, everything in the material universe has both matter and form, and the form of a living thing is its soul (Greek psyche, Latin anima). There are three kinds of souls: the vegetative soul of plants, which causes them to grow and decay and nourish themselves, but does not cause motion and sensation; the animal soul, which causes animals to move and feel; and the rational soul, which is the source of consciousness and reasoning, which (Aristotle believed) is found only in man. Each higher soul has all of the attributes of the lower ones. Aristotle believed that while matter can exist without form, form cannot exist without matter, and that therefore the soul cannot exist without the body.

This account is consistent with teleological explanations of life, which account for phenomena in terms of purpose or goal-directedness. Thus, the whiteness of the polar bear's coat is explained by its purpose of camouflage. The direction of causality (from the future to the past) is in contradiction with the scientific evidence for natural selection, which explains the consequence in terms of a prior cause. Biological features are explained not by looking at future optimal results, but by looking at the past evolutionary history of a species, which led to the natural selection of the features in question.

Spontaneous generation 

Spontaneous generation was the belief that living organisms can form without descent from similar organisms. Typically, the idea was that certain forms such as fleas could arise from inanimate matter such as dust or the supposed seasonal generation of mice and insects from mud or garbage.

The theory of spontaneous generation was proposed by Aristotle, who compiled and expanded the work of prior natural philosophers and the various ancient explanations of the appearance of organisms; it was considered the best explanation for two millennia. It was decisively dispelled by the experiments of Louis Pasteur in 1859, who expanded upon the investigations of predecessors such as Francesco Redi. Disproof of the traditional ideas of spontaneous generation is no longer controversial among biologists.

Vitalism

Vitalism is the belief that the life-principle is non-material. This originated with Georg Ernst Stahl (17th century), and remained popular until the middle of the 19th century. It appealed to philosophers such as Henri Bergson, Friedrich Nietzsche, and Wilhelm Dilthey, anatomists like Xavier Bichat, and chemists like Justus von Liebig. Vitalism included the idea that there was a fundamental difference between organic and inorganic material, and the belief that organic material can only be derived from living things. This was disproved in 1828, when Friedrich Wöhler prepared urea from inorganic materials. This Wöhler synthesis is considered the starting point of modern organic chemistry. It is of historical significance because for the first time an organic compound was produced in inorganic reactions.

During the 1850s Hermann von Helmholtz, anticipated by Julius Robert von Mayer, demonstrated that no energy is lost in muscle movement, suggesting that there were no "vital forces" necessary to move a muscle. These results led to the abandonment of scientific interest in vitalistic theories, especially after Buchner's demonstration that alcoholic fermentation could occur in cell-free extracts of yeast.
Nonetheless, the belief still exists in pseudoscientific theories such as homoeopathy, which interprets diseases and sickness as caused by disturbances in a hypothetical vital force or life force.

Origin

The age of Earth is about 4.54 billion years. Evidence suggests that life on Earth has existed for at least 3.5 billion years, with the oldest physical traces of life dating back 3.7 billion years; however, some hypotheses, such as Late Heavy Bombardment, suggest that life on Earth may have started even earlier, as early as 4.1–4.4 billion years ago, and the chemistry leading to life may have begun shortly after the Big Bang, 13.8 billion years ago, during an epoch when the universe was only 10–17 million years old. Time estimates from molecular clocks, as summarized in TimeTree, generally place the origin of life around 4.0 billion years ago or earlier. 

More than 99% of all species of life forms, amounting to over five billion species, that ever lived on Earth are estimated to be extinct.

Although the number of Earth's catalogued species of lifeforms is between 1.2 million and 2 million, the total number of species in the planet is uncertain. Estimates range from 8 million to 100 million, with a more narrow range between 10 and 14 million, but it may be as high as 1 trillion (with only one-thousandth of one per cent of the species described) according to studies realised in May 2016. The total number of related DNA base pairs on Earth is estimated at 5.0 x 1037 and weighs 50 billion tonnes. In comparison, the total mass of the biosphere has been estimated to be as much as 4 TtC (trillion tons of carbon). In July 2016, scientists reported identifying a set of 355 genes from the Last Universal Common Ancestor (LUCA) of all organisms living on Earth.

All known life forms share fundamental molecular mechanisms, reflecting their common descent; based on these observations, hypotheses on the origin of life attempt to find a mechanism explaining the formation of a universal common ancestor, from simple organic molecules via pre-cellular life to protocells and metabolism. Models have been divided into "genes-first" and "metabolism-first" categories, but a recent trend is the emergence of hybrid models that combine both categories.

There is no current scientific consensus as to how life originated. However, most accepted scientific models build on the Miller–Urey experiment and the work of Sidney Fox, which show that conditions on the primitive Earth favoured chemical reactions that synthesize amino acids and other organic compounds from inorganic precursors, and phospholipids spontaneously form lipid bilayers, the basic structure of a cell membrane.

Living organisms synthesize proteins, which are polymers of amino acids using instructions encoded by deoxyribonucleic acid (DNA). Protein synthesis entails intermediary ribonucleic acid (RNA) polymers. One possibility for how life began is that genes originated first, followed by proteins; the alternative being that proteins came first and then genes.

However, because genes and proteins are both required to produce the other, the problem of considering which came first is like that of the chicken or the egg. Most scientists have adopted the hypothesis that because of this, it is unlikely that genes and proteins arose independently.

Therefore, a possibility, first suggested by Francis Crick, is that the first life was based on RNA, which has the DNA-like properties of information storage and the catalytic properties of some proteins. This is called the RNA world hypothesis, and it is supported by the observation that many of the most critical components of cells (those that evolve the slowest) are composed mostly or entirely of RNA. Also, many critical cofactors (ATP, Acetyl-CoA, NADH, etc.) are either nucleotides or substances clearly related to them. The catalytic properties of RNA had not yet been demonstrated when the hypothesis was first proposed, but they were confirmed by Thomas Cech in 1986.

One issue with the RNA world hypothesis is that synthesis of RNA from simple inorganic precursors is more difficult than for other organic molecules. One reason for this is that RNA precursors are very stable and react with each other very slowly under ambient conditions, and it has also been proposed that living organisms consisted of other molecules before RNA. However, the successful synthesis of certain RNA molecules under the conditions that existed prior to life on Earth has been achieved by adding alternative precursors in a specified order with the precursor phosphate present throughout the reaction. This study makes the RNA world hypothesis more plausible.

Geological findings in 2013 showed that reactive phosphorus species (like phosphite) were in abundance in the ocean before 3.5 Ga, and that Schreibersite easily reacts with aqueous glycerol to generate phosphite and glycerol 3-phosphate. It is hypothesized that Schreibersite-containing meteorites from the Late Heavy Bombardment could have provided early reduced phosphorus, which could react with prebiotic organic molecules to form phosphorylated biomolecules, like RNA.

In 2009, experiments demonstrated Darwinian evolution of a two-component system of RNA enzymes (ribozymes) in vitro. The work was performed in the laboratory of Gerald Joyce, who stated "This is the first example, outside of biology, of evolutionary adaptation in a molecular genetic system."

Prebiotic compounds may have originated extraterrestrially. NASA findings in 2011, based on studies with meteorites found on Earth, suggest DNA and RNA components (adenine, guanine and related organic molecules) may be formed in outer space.

In March 2015, NASA scientists reported that, for the first time, complex DNA and RNA organic compounds of life, including uracil, cytosine and thymine, have been formed in the laboratory under outer space conditions, using starting chemicals, such as pyrimidine, found in meteorites. Pyrimidine, like polycyclic aromatic hydrocarbons (PAHs), the most carbon-rich chemical found in the universe, may have been formed in red giants or in interstellar dust and gas clouds, according to the scientists.

According to the panspermia hypothesis, microscopic life—distributed by meteoroids, asteroids and other small Solar System bodies—may exist throughout the universe.

Environmental conditions

The diversity of life on Earth is a result of the dynamic interplay between genetic opportunity, metabolic capability, environmental challenges, and symbiosis. For most of its existence, Earth's habitable environment has been dominated by microorganisms and subjected to their metabolism and evolution. As a consequence of these microbial activities, the physical-chemical environment on Earth has been changing on a geologic time scale, thereby affecting the path of evolution of subsequent life. For example, the release of molecular oxygen by cyanobacteria as a by-product of photosynthesis induced global changes in the Earth's environment. Because oxygen was toxic to most life on Earth at the time, this posed novel evolutionary challenges, and ultimately resulted in the formation of Earth's major animal and plant species. This interplay between organisms and their environment is an inherent feature of living systems.

Biosphere

The biosphere is the global sum of all ecosystems. It can also be termed as the zone of life on Earth, a closed system (apart from solar and cosmic radiation and heat from the interior of the Earth), and largely self-regulating. By the most general biophysiological definition, the biosphere is the global ecological system integrating all living beings and their relationships, including their interaction with the elements of the lithosphere, geosphere, hydrosphere, and atmosphere.

Under certain test conditions, life forms have been observed to thrive in the near-weightlessness of space and to survive in the vacuum of outer space. Life forms appear to thrive in the Mariana Trench, the deepest spot in the Earth's oceans. According to one researcher, "You can find microbes everywhere—they're extremely adaptable to conditions, and survive wherever they are."

The biosphere is postulated to have evolved, beginning with a process of biopoesis (life created naturally from non-living matter, such as simple organic compounds) or biogenesis (life created from living matter), at least some 3.5 billion years ago. The earliest evidence for life on Earth includes biogenic graphite found in 3.7 billion-year-old metasedimentary rocks from Western Greenland and microbial mat fossils found in 3.48 billion-year-old sandstone from Western Australia. More recently, in 2015, "remains of biotic life" were found in 4.1 billion-year-old rocks in Western Australia. In 2017, putative fossilised microorganisms (or microfossils) were announced to have been discovered in hydrothermal vent precipitates in the Nuvvuagittuq Belt of Quebec, Canada that were as old as 4.28 billion years, the oldest record of life on Earth, suggesting "an almost instantaneous emergence of life" after ocean formation 4.4 billion years ago, and not long after the formation of the Earth 4.54 billion years ago. According to biologist Stephen Blair Hedges, "If life arose relatively quickly on Earth ... then it could be common in the universe."

In a general sense, biospheres are any closed, self-regulating systems containing ecosystems. This includes artificial biospheres such as Biosphere 2 and BIOS-3, and potentially ones on other planets or moons.

Range of tolerance

The inert components of an ecosystem are the physical and chemical factors necessary for life—energy (sunlight or chemical energy), water, heat, atmosphere, gravity, nutrients, and ultraviolet solar radiation protection. In most ecosystems, the conditions vary during the day and from one season to the next. To live in most ecosystems, then, organisms must be able to survive a range of conditions, called the "range of tolerance." Outside that are the "zones of physiological stress," where the survival and reproduction are possible but not optimal. Beyond these zones are the "zones of intolerance," where survival and reproduction of that organism is unlikely or impossible. Organisms that have a wide range of tolerance are more widely distributed than organisms with a narrow range of tolerance.

Extremophiles

To survive, selected microorganisms can assume forms that enable them to withstand freezing, complete desiccation, starvation, high levels of radiation exposure, and other physical or chemical challenges. These microorganisms may survive exposure to such conditions for weeks, months, years, or even centuries. Extremophiles are microbial life forms that thrive outside the ranges where life is commonly found. They excel at exploiting uncommon sources of energy. While all organisms are composed of nearly identical molecules, evolution has enabled such microbes to cope with this wide range of physical and chemical conditions. Characterization of the structure and metabolic diversity of microbial communities in such extreme environments is ongoing.

Microbial life forms thrive even in the Mariana Trench, the deepest spot in the Earth's oceans. Expeditions of the International Ocean Discovery Program found unicellular life in 120 °C sediment that is 1.2 km below seafloor in the Nankai Trough subduction zone.

Investigation of the tenacity and versatility of life on Earth, as well as an understanding of the molecular systems that some organisms utilise to survive such extremes, is important for the search for life beyond Earth. For example, lichen could survive for a month in a simulated Martian environment.

Chemical elements
All life forms require certain core chemical elements needed for biochemical functioning. These include carbon, hydrogen, nitrogen, oxygen, phosphorus, and sulfur—the elemental macronutrients for all organisms—often represented by the acronym CHNOPS. Together these make up nucleic acids, proteins and lipids, the bulk of living matter. Five of these six elements comprise the chemical components of DNA, the exception being sulfur. The latter is a component of the amino acids cysteine and methionine. The most biologically abundant of these elements is carbon, which has the desirable attribute of forming multiple, stable covalent bonds. This allows carbon-based (organic) molecules to form an immense variety of chemical arrangements. Alternative hypothetical types of biochemistry have been proposed that eliminate one or more of these elements, swap out an element for one not on the list, or change required chiralities or other chemical properties.

DNA

Deoxyribonucleic acid is a molecule that carries most of the genetic instructions used in the growth, development, functioning and reproduction of all known living organisms and many viruses. DNA and RNA are nucleic acids; alongside proteins and complex carbohydrates, they are one of the three major types of macromolecule that are essential for all known forms of life. Most DNA molecules consist of two biopolymer strands coiled around each other to form a double helix. The two DNA strands are known as polynucleotides since they are composed of simpler units called nucleotides. Each nucleotide is composed of a nitrogen-containing nucleobase—either cytosine (C), guanine (G), adenine (A), or thymine (T)—as well as a sugar called deoxyribose and a phosphate group. The nucleotides are joined to one another in a chain by covalent bonds between the sugar of one nucleotide and the phosphate of the next, resulting in an alternating sugar-phosphate backbone. According to base pairing rules (A with T, and C with G), hydrogen bonds bind the nitrogenous bases of the two separate polynucleotide strands to make double-stranded DNA. The total amount of related DNA base pairs on Earth is estimated at 5.0 x 1037, and weighs 50 billion tonnes. In comparison, the total mass of the biosphere has been estimated to be as much as 4 TtC (trillion tons of carbon).

DNA stores biological information. The DNA backbone is resistant to cleavage, and both strands of the double-stranded structure store the same biological information. Biological information is replicated as the two strands are separated. A significant portion of DNA (more than 98% for humans) is non-coding, meaning that these sections do not serve as patterns for protein sequences.

The two strands of DNA run in opposite directions to each other and are, therefore, anti-parallel. Attached to each sugar is one of four types of nucleobases (informally, bases). It is the sequence of these four nucleobases along the backbone that encodes biological information. Under the genetic code, RNA strands are translated to specify the sequence of amino acids within proteins. These RNA strands are initially created using DNA strands as a template in a process called transcription.

Within cells, DNA is organised into long structures called chromosomes. During cell division these chromosomes are duplicated in the process of DNA replication, providing each cell its own complete set of chromosomes. Eukaryotic organisms (animals, plants, fungi, and protists) store most of their DNA inside the cell nucleus and some of their DNA in organelles, such as mitochondria or chloroplasts. In contrast, prokaryotes (bacteria and archaea) store their DNA only in the cytoplasm. Within the chromosomes, chromatin proteins such as histones compact and organise DNA. These compact structures guide the interactions between DNA and other proteins, helping control which parts of the DNA are transcribed.

DNA was first isolated by Friedrich Miescher in 1869. Its molecular structure was identified by James Watson and Francis Crick in 1953, whose model-building efforts were guided by X-ray diffraction data acquired by Rosalind Franklin.

Classification

Antiquity
The first known attempt to classify organisms was conducted by the Greek philosopher Aristotle (384–322 BC), who classified all living organisms known at that time as either a plant or an animal, based mainly on their ability to move. He also distinguished animals with blood from animals without blood (or at least without red blood), which can be compared with the concepts of vertebrates and invertebrates respectively, and divided the blooded animals into five groups: viviparous quadrupeds (mammals), oviparous quadrupeds (reptiles and amphibians), birds, fishes and whales. The bloodless animals were also divided into five groups: cephalopods, crustaceans, insects (which included the spiders, scorpions, and centipedes, in addition to what we define as insects today), shelled animals (such as most molluscs and echinoderms), and "zoophytes" (animals that resemble plants). Though Aristotle's work in zoology was not without errors, it was the grandest biological synthesis of the time and remained the ultimate authority for many centuries after his death.

Linnaean 
The exploration of the Americas revealed large numbers of new plants and animals that needed descriptions and classification. In the latter part of the 16th century and the beginning of the 17th, careful study of animals commenced and was gradually extended until it formed a sufficient body of knowledge to serve as an anatomical basis for classification.

In the late 1740s, Carl Linnaeus introduced his system of binomial nomenclature for the classification of species. Linnaeus attempted to improve the composition and reduce the length of the previously used many-worded names by abolishing unnecessary rhetoric, introducing new descriptive terms and precisely defining their meaning. The Linnaean classification has eight levels: domains, kingdoms, phyla, class, order, family, genus, and species.

The fungi were originally treated as plants. For a short period Linnaeus had classified them in the taxon Vermes in Animalia, but later placed them back in Plantae. Copeland classified the Fungi in his Protoctista, thus partially avoiding the problem but acknowledging their special status. The problem was eventually solved by Whittaker, when he gave them their own kingdom in his five-kingdom system. Evolutionary history shows that the fungi are more closely related to animals than to plants.

As new discoveries enabled detailed study of cells and microorganisms, new groups of life were revealed, and the fields of cell biology and microbiology were created. These new organisms were originally described separately in protozoa as animals and protophyta/thallophyta as plants, but were united by Haeckel in the kingdom Protista; later, the prokaryotes were split off in the kingdom Monera, which would eventually be divided into two separate groups, the Bacteria and the Archaea. This led to the six-kingdom system and eventually to the current three-domain system, which is based on evolutionary relationships. However, the classification of eukaryotes, especially of protists, is still controversial.

As microbiology, molecular biology and virology developed, non-cellular reproducing agents were discovered, such as viruses and viroids. Whether these are considered alive has been a matter of debate; viruses lack characteristics of life such as cell membranes, metabolism and the ability to grow or respond to their environments. Viruses can still be classed into "species" based on their biology and genetics, but many aspects of such a classification remain controversial.

In May 2016, scientists reported that 1 trillion species are estimated to be on Earth currently with only one-thousandth of one per cent described.

The original Linnaean system has been modified over time as follows:

Cells

Cells are the basic unit of structure in every living thing, and all cells arise from pre-existing cells by division. Cell theory was formulated by Henri Dutrochet, Theodor Schwann, Rudolf Virchow and others during the early nineteenth century, and subsequently became widely accepted. The activity of an organism depends on the total activity of its cells, with energy flow occurring within and between them. Cells contain hereditary information that is carried forward as a genetic code during cell division.

There are two primary types of cells. Prokaryotes lack a nucleus and other membrane-bound organelles, although they have circular DNA and ribosomes. Bacteria and Archaea are two domains of prokaryotes. The other primary type of cells are the eukaryotes, which have distinct nuclei bound by a nuclear membrane and membrane-bound organelles, including mitochondria, chloroplasts, lysosomes, rough and smooth endoplasmic reticulum, and vacuoles. In addition, they possess organised chromosomes that store genetic material. All species of large complex organisms are eukaryotes, including animals, plants and fungi, though most species of eukaryote are protist microorganisms. The conventional model is that eukaryotes evolved from prokaryotes, with the main organelles of the eukaryotes forming through endosymbiosis between bacteria and the progenitor eukaryotic cell.

The molecular mechanisms of cell biology are based on proteins. Most of these are synthesised by the ribosomes through an enzyme-catalyzed process called protein biosynthesis. A sequence of amino acids is assembled and joined based upon gene expression of the cell's nucleic acid. In eukaryotic cells, these proteins may then be transported and processed through the Golgi apparatus in preparation for dispatch to their destination.

Cells reproduce through a process of cell division in which the parent cell divides into two or more daughter cells. For prokaryotes, cell division occurs through a process of fission in which the DNA is replicated, then the two copies are attached to parts of the cell membrane. In eukaryotes, a more complex process of mitosis is followed. However, the result is the same; the resulting cell copies are identical to each other and to the original cell (except for mutations), and both are capable of further division following an interphase period.

Multicellular organisms may have first evolved through the formation of colonies of identical cells. These cells can form group organisms through cell adhesion. The individual members of a colony are capable of surviving on their own, whereas the members of a true multi-cellular organism have developed specialisations, making them dependent on the remainder of the organism for survival. Such organisms are formed clonally or from a single germ cell that is capable of forming the various specialised cells that form the adult organism. This specialisation allows multicellular organisms to exploit resources more efficiently than single cells. In January 2016, scientists reported that, about 800 million years ago, a minor genetic change in a single molecule, called GK-PID, may have allowed organisms to go from a single cell organism to one of many cells.

Cells have evolved methods to perceive and respond to their microenvironment, thereby enhancing their adaptability. Cell signalling coordinates cellular activities, and hence governs the basic functions of multicellular organisms. Signaling between cells can occur through direct cell contact using juxtacrine signalling, or indirectly through the exchange of agents as in the endocrine system. In more complex organisms, coordination of activities can occur through a dedicated nervous system.

Extraterrestrial

Though life is confirmed only on Earth, many think that extraterrestrial life is not only plausible, but probable or inevitable. Other planets and moons in the Solar System and other planetary systems are being examined for evidence of having once supported simple life, and projects such as SETI are trying to detect radio transmissions from possible alien civilisations. Other locations within the Solar System that may host microbial life include the subsurface of Mars, the upper atmosphere of Venus, and subsurface oceans on some of the moons of the giant planets.
Beyond the Solar System, the region around another main-sequence star that could support Earth-like life on an Earth-like planet is known as the habitable zone. The inner and outer radii of this zone vary with the luminosity of the star, as does the time interval during which the zone survives. Stars more massive than the Sun have a larger habitable zone, but remain on the Sun-like "main sequence" of stellar evolution for a shorter time interval. Small red dwarfs have the opposite problem, with a smaller habitable zone that is subject to higher levels of magnetic activity and the effects of tidal locking from close orbits. Hence, stars in the intermediate mass range such as the Sun may have a greater likelihood for Earth-like life to develop. The location of the star within a galaxy may also affect the likelihood of life forming. Stars in regions with a greater abundance of heavier elements that can form planets, in combination with a low rate of potentially habitat-damaging supernova events, are predicted to have a higher probability of hosting planets with complex life. The variables of the Drake equation are used to discuss the conditions in planetary systems where civilisation is most likely to exist. Use of the equation to predict the amount of extraterrestrial life, however, is difficult; because many of the variables are unknown, the equation functions as more of a mirror to what its user already thinks. As a result, the number of civilisations in the galaxy can be estimated as low as 9.1 x 10−13, suggesting a minimum value of 1, or as high as 15.6 million (1.56 x 108); for the calculations, see Drake equation.

A "Confidence of Life Detection" scale (CoLD) for reporting evidence of life beyond Earth has been proposed.

Artificial

Artificial life is the simulation of any aspect of life, as through computers, robotics, or biochemistry. The study of artificial life imitates traditional biology by recreating some aspects of biological phenomena. Scientists study the logic of living systems by creating artificial environments—seeking to understand the complex information processing that defines such systems. While life is, by definition, alive, artificial life is generally referred to as data confined to a digital environment and existence.

Synthetic biology is a new area of biotechnology that combines science and biological engineering. The common goal is the design and construction of new biological functions and systems not found in nature. Synthetic biology includes the broad redefinition and expansion of biotechnology, with the ultimate goals of being able to design and build engineered biological systems that process information, manipulate chemicals, fabricate materials and structures, produce energy, provide food, and maintain and enhance human health and the environment.

Death

Death is the termination of all vital functions or life processes in an organism or cell. It can occur as a result of an accident, violence, medical conditions, biological interaction, malnutrition, poisoning, senescence, or suicide. After death, the remains of an organism re-enter the biogeochemical cycle. Organisms may be consumed by a predator or a scavenger and leftover organic material may then be further decomposed by detritivores, organisms that recycle detritus, returning it to the environment for reuse in the food chain.

One of the challenges in defining death is in distinguishing it from life. Death would seem to refer to either the moment life ends, or when the state that follows life begins. However, determining when death has occurred is difficult, as cessation of life functions is often not simultaneous across organ systems. Such determination, therefore, requires drawing conceptual lines between life and death. This is problematic, however, because there is little consensus over how to define life. The nature of death has for millennia been a central concern of the world's religious traditions and of philosophical inquiry. Many religions maintain faith in either a kind of afterlife or reincarnation for the soul, or resurrection of the body at a later date.

Extinction

Extinction is the process by which a group of taxa or species dies out, reducing biodiversity. The moment of extinction is generally considered the death of the last individual of that species. Because a species' potential range may be very large, determining this moment is difficult, and is usually done retrospectively after a period of apparent absence. Species become extinct when they are no longer able to survive in changing habitat or against superior competition. Over 99% of all the species that have ever lived are now extinct. Mass extinctions may have accelerated evolution by providing opportunities for new groups of organisms to diversify.

Fossils

Fossils are the preserved remains or traces of animals, plants, and other organisms from the remote past. The totality of fossils, both discovered and undiscovered, and their placement in fossil-containing rock formations and sedimentary layers (strata) is known as the fossil record. A preserved specimen is called a fossil if it is older than the arbitrary date of 10,000 years ago. Hence, fossils range in age from the youngest at the start of the Holocene Epoch to the oldest from the Archaean Eon, up to 3.4 billion years old.

See also

 Biology, the study of life
 Astrobiology
 Biosignature
 History of life
 Lists of organisms by population
 Phylogenetics
 Viable system theory
 Central dogma of molecular biology
 Epigenetics 
 Synthetic biology
 Hypothetical types of biochemistry 
 Carbon-based life

Notes

References

Further reading

External links

 Life (Systema Naturae 2000)
 Vitae (BioLib)
 Biota (Taxonomicon)
 Wikispecies – a free directory of life
 Resources for life in the Solar System and in galaxy, and the potential scope of life in the cosmological future
 "The Adjacent Possible: A Talk with Stuart Kauffman"
 Stanford Encyclopedia of Philosophy entry
 The Kingdoms of Life

 
Main topic articles